XNQ may refer to:
 Fairchild XNQ, an American trainer for the United States Navy
 ISO 639:xnq, the ISO 639 code for the Ngoni language